East West Rail is a major project to establish a strategic railway connecting East Anglia with Central, Southern and Western England. In particular, it plans to build (or rebuild) a line linking Oxford and Cambridge via Bicester, Milton Keynes (at Bletchley) and Bedford, largely using the trackbed of the former Varsity Line. Thus it provides a route between any or all of the Great Western, Chiltern, West Coast, Midland, East Coast, West Anglia, Great Eastern and the Cotswold main lines, avoiding London. The government approved the western section (from Oxford to Bedford) in November 2011, with completion of this section expected by 2025. , the company aims to complete the central section by "the mid 2020s". , electrification of the line is not planned, but the 2019 decision (to rule it out) is under review. 
The plan is divided into three sections:
"Western section" from Oxford to Bedford on the former Varsity Line route, taking advantage of the recently reconstructed Oxford-Bicester line and the existing BletchleyBedford Marston Vale line (leaving just BicesterBletchley to be rebuilt);
the original scope of this section included a branch line to : , this element is 'under review';
"Central section" from Bedford to Cambridge over a substantially new alignment;
"Eastern section" from Cambridge to Norwich, Felixstowe and Ipswich on existing lines.
It was initially promoted (as the East West Rail Link) by the East-West Rail Consortium, a consortium of local authorities and interested bodies along the route. Since 2013 it has been adopted by the Department for Transport and, in late 2017, the government announced that will be delivered by a quango, the East West Railway Company (rather than Network Rail). 

Phase 1 of the western section, the segment from Oxford via  to the junction with the Chiltern Main Line, has been operational since December 2016. On 5 February 2020, the Department for Transport made the Transport and Works Act Order for Phase 2 of the western section, the BicesterBletchley and AylesburyClaydon segments. On 30 January 2020, the East West Railway Company announced its preferred route for the BedfordCambridge (or 'central') section. In April 2020, engineering work began on the route of the BicesterBletchley segment.

The eastern section, Bedford to Cambridge and Western improvements is categorised as a nationally significant infrastructure project. There have been proposals that the extended railway should go from Cardiff to Norwich and for the East West Main Line (EWML).

History

Origins
The link is promoted by the East West Rail Main Line Partnership (originally called the "East West Rail Consortium") which was initiated by Ipswich Borough Council in 1995. 
The council and its neighbours were particularly concerned about poor services within East Anglia and the links to London. Some success was achieved east of Cambridge, at least partly through the efforts of the group.

In April 2006, the Office of the Deputy Prime Minister reported itself to be in favour of the principle of re-opening the link between Bedford and Oxford.

In May 2006, the Department for Transport (DfT) announced specific plans for Bletchley railway station. The document stated that "it is likely" that Bletchley area renewals and network simplification will take place "by 2010", "to include a high-level platform" for Bedford trains. "The network will be suitable for the later addition of any 'East-West' link to and from Oxford and for the operation of through links from either Oxford or Bedford to and from Milton Keynes".

In March 2007, a study (funded by the East West Rail Consortium) stated that

In April 2008, the DfT responded to an e-petition for support on East West Rail by reiterating that they would encourage private funding.

This was confirmed in July 2012 when the Secretary of State for Transport, Justine Greening, announced that the Western section of East West Rail (EWR) would be part of the government's strategy for rail transport.

Western section

The western section will link Oxford and Bedford via Bletchley, with connections to the West Coast Main Line and the Midland Main Line. It will use the Oxford–Bicester line, a renovated section of the Varsity Line from Bicester to Bletchley, and finally the Marston Vale line from Bletchley to Bedford. The existing Cherwell Valley line will form a link to the Great Western Main Line at Didcot Parkway railway station.

The first part of this work, doubling the Oxford–Bicester line and connecting it to the Chiltern Main Line, was largely completed in 2015 (and fully operational from December 2016); the remaining work from Bicester (and Aylesbury) to Bedford has been greatly delayed, and is scheduled for completion in 'late 2023'.

On 3 February 2020, the DfT made the Transport and Works Act Order for the BicesterBletchley and AylesburyClaydon sections. The Planning Inspectorate's report had indicated that the scheme was fully funded, as confirmed by a DfT letter dated 9 February 2018, with a budget for this phase of £1,084,726,000, consisting of £150.095million in Control Period 5 (2014–2019) (sic) and £934.631million in Control Period 6 (2019–2024) but that, if the Order was not made in 2019, delays of 6 to 12 months could be expected with an impact on its integration with HS2 and a resulting significant increase in costs which had not been allowed for in that funding.

Planning
In February 2008, the consortium published a business case for re-opening the western section of the route funded by Milton Keynes Partnership (MKP), South East England Regional Assembly, South East England Development Agency and the consortium.

In March 2008, a £2million engineering survey of the existing and removed tracks was launched, and those undertaking the engineering survey stated that a  link between Oxford and Bletchley could be achieved for around £190million. If construction had started in 2009 as they then hoped, the upgraded / re-opened line could have been in service by 2012.

In November 2008, the Milton Keynes Partnership, Chiltern Railways and the consortium formally agreed to take their proposals forward together. Chiltern Railways would take the lead on the upgrading of the Oxford-Bicester section with its Project Evergreen 3 and the Milton Keynes Partnership would lead for the rest of the line to Bletchley.

In December 2008, the commissioning of a further report, to take the project forward to  Stage 4 (single option selection), was announced. This was to encompass work to analyse the additional requirements (as outlined above), not previously considered in detail, to  Stage 3 equivalent, as well as revisiting the future requirements for the existing Bletchley-Bedford line.

According to section 3 of the October 2008 progress report, during 2008 a number of proposals from other parties emerged which might have a significant impact on the project:
an aspiration to use the route as part of a strategic freight route
an aspiration to provide longer-distance north-south passenger services avoiding Birmingham, which could use the western section as part of its route
a proposal by Chiltern Railways to run Oxford-Bicester-London passenger services via a [then] mooted new south-to-east chord to the existing Chiltern line. (This chord has been built and is now in use).

Section 3 also states that there is some uncertainty over various parties' requirements for the existing Bletchley-Bedford railway.

Infrastructural assessment investigations would be taken forward in parallel with this work funded by £2million of contribution, half directly by the Department for Communities and Local Government and the other half in varying proportions from various local authorities' Growth Area Funding allocation. Work to clear vegetation from the redundant section of line for the infrastructure assessment started in January 2009.

In January 2021, East West Railway Company revised the phasing of the project, with delivery to be in three ‘connection stages’: Oxford – Milton Keynes; Oxford – Bedford; Oxford – Cambridge, and plans for the Aylesbury branch to be reviewed.

Design
The February 2008 report identified two options defined from different perspectives, the "Regional Rail" option (the best commercial case) and the "Local Rail" option (as identified by the requirements mainly of local authorities and business interests). As part of existing upgrades, a new bay platform has been provided at Milton Keynes Central, which will be able to receive the local services. The infrastructure between Oxford and Bletchley required by both options is essentially the same. The spur from Calvert to Aylesbury is only included in the Local option, though about 20% of southern part of the route has already been reinstated under the Aylesbury Vale Parkway project. The line from north of Wolvercote Tunnel (just north of Oxford) through Bicester to Bletchley would be enabled for  double-track running. The Oxford–Wolvercote Tunnel section, and the Aylesbury–Calvert line if also provided, would be  single-track working. A new high-level platform would be provided at Bletchley, with new stations (under the Local option only) at Winslow and Newton Longville.

The Planning Inspectorate's report to the Minister for Transport, in support of the (presumed) final Transport and Works Act Order (January 2020), has firmed up on these principles. The platforms at Aylesbury Vale Parkway, Bletchley High Level and Winslow are to be specified as suitable for trains no longer than four cars. The section between Oxford and Bletchley is specified as double-track,  max.; AylesburyClaydon LNE Junction is to be single-track (with space but no underpinnings for a second track), up to  but BletchleyBedford is to remain at  maximum. The line is not initially to be electrified but constructed so as to facilitate electrification at a later date. The proposed Newton Longville station does not appear. There are no funded plans for north-to-east chords at Bicester (to enable a direct Bletchley service) or at Bletchley (to enable a direct Milton Keynes CentralBedford service).

Service pattern

East West Rail Ltd plans this service pattern on the Western section:

London Northwestern Railway will continue to run the Bletchley-Bedford stopping service on the Marston Vale line.

Additionally, since December 2016, Chiltern Railways have provided 2tph between Oxford and London Marylebone using the section between Oxford and Bicester as part of Chiltern's Evergreen 3 project. The necessary chord between the Oxford–Bletchley line and the Chiltern Main Line has been completed and the service commenced [initially from Oxford Parkway] on 26 October 2015.

The TWAO states that no provision is to be made for a Milton Keynes CentralMarylebone service, or for an AylesburyManchester Piccadilly service.

Approval
At that stage it was due for completion in 2019.

On 16 July 2012, the East-West Rail Consortium made the following announcement:

Developments and announcements for western section 

On 10 January 2013, Network Rail announced its intention to construct the western section between Bedford and Oxford, Aylesbury and Milton Keynes, as part of their five-year strategic business plan (2014–2019). The target date for train services to be operational on this section was December 2017. Electrification of the line between Oxford and Bedford was also included in the budget and target completion date was March 2017. 

In November 2013, the East West Rail Consortium pledged an additional £45million to the project. The chair of the East West Rail joint delivery board, Councillor Janet Blake presented a letter to Transport Minister Philip Hammond, confirming the financial commitment from the Board.

From 1 February 2014, Network Rail began clearing vegetation that had grown over the abandoned track.

In March 2014, Carillion and Buckingham Group announced that they were to undertake construction of the new link, commencing with the Oxford to Bicester stretch, with a contract value of £87million, but later that month Network Rail stated that there would be a delay in the completion of the line by two years until 2019.

Early in April 2014, Network Rail acknowledged that the busy level crossing in Milton Keynes between Woburn Sands and Wavendon is presenting "a headache". The report goes on to say that the crossing near Bow Brickhill (Brickhill Street in Milton Keynes to the A5) will be replaced with a bridge.

In May 2014, Network Rail announced that the line will be opened to  running, the current top speed for InterCity services. It is proposed that CrossCountry services, along with Chiltern Railways and London Northwestern Railway services will use the route.

In July 2015, Sir Peter Hendy was appointed chairman of Network Rail "and asked by the Secretary of State to conduct a thorough review of the enhancement programme in England and Wales to see what can be delivered in an affordable and timely way within the funding period to 2019".</ref> The report states "During CP5 development work will continue into the full re-opening of the route between Bicester and Bletchley [...] and delivery will be started as soon as possible". However, in the table that lists in detail the revised work programme, the route is shown as one of the "Projects with significant delivery in CP5 and completion in CP6". (CP5 is 2014–2019; CP6 is 2019–2024.)

As part of the Budget of March 2016, the Chancellor, George Osborne, wrote to the National Infrastructure Commission (NIC) to ask them to develop proposals for unlocking growth, housing and jobs in the Cambridge – Milton Keynes – Oxford corridor. The letter made reference to the East West Rail Link, raising the possibility of further development of the line in the future.

In May 2016, the Department for Transport revealed that it 'is considering a new franchise to operate services on the east-west rail link' and that 'development of the proposed franchise will start in 2018 (including a competition period)'.

By August 2016, it became clear that Network Rail considers the project to be 'no longer the third most important project in the country' (after HS2 and Crossrail) and that delivery of the core of the Western Section (Oxford to Bedford via Bletchley) might slip beyond 2024, with the connection to Aylesbury due even later. Councillor Rodney Rose, chair of the East West Rail Consortium suggested that the main causes of the delay include delays arising from rail electrification difficulties and fiscal uncertainty arising from the UK's decision to leave the European Union. In October 2016, the Minister instructed Network Rail to delete electrification from the design, but to maintain clearances to permit a retrofit at an unspecified future date.

In November 2016, Chancellor of the Exchequer Philip Hammond announced £110million funding to ensure completion of the BicesterBedford segment by 2025.

In December 2016, the Transport Secretary announced his decision to privatise the line. A new entity will be responsible for track and infrastructure, as well as operating train services, which, he believes, will deliver an Oxford–Cambridge service at an earlier date than is realistic for an overcommitted Network Rail.

In July 2017, Network Rail began a public consultation on the details of its proposals for the BicesterBedford section.

In August 2017, the East West Rail Alliance, the consortium  VolkerRail, Atkins, Laing O'Rourke and Network Rail  developing the Western section, noted that the decision by the Department for Transport to delete electrification from the specification was causing further delay to the programme, because work already done on the TWA applications would need to be reworked.

In November 2017, in its report on the Cambridge – Milton Keynes – Oxford corridor, the NIC called for the line between Bicester and Bedford to be reopened by 2023 and Bedford/Cambridge by 2030, and for the development and construction of a link between the M1 motorway and Oxford by 2030, as part of the proposed Oxford–Cambridge Expressway. In his budget of November 2017 the Chancellor, Philip Hammond, allocated further funding to open the western section by 2024 via a new company, the East West Railway Company, which was established in December 2017.

In December 2017, the Transport Secretary announced the establishment of a new East West Railway Company which will oversee the establishment of both the Western & Central Sections of East West Rail Link. The budget in November 2017 announced the completion of the central section by 2030 and a preferred route to be announced in early 2019 following a number of public consultations.

In April 2018, the chairman of the East West Railway Company, Rob Brighouse, suggested a new line between Milton Keynes and Bedford might avoid the problems with the current Marston Vale Line. These problems are the all-stations hourly stopping service operated by London Northwestern Railway and numerous level crossing on the route: these could limit capacity for through regional trains. He acknowledged that this proposal could be expensive but suggested the private sector could help fund it. He also suggested then that the Western Section could be completed by 2022, ahead of the planned 2024 opening date.

On 27 July 2018, Network Rail submitted a Transport and Works Act Order (TWAO) application to the Secretary of State for Transport for the Bicester-Bletchley segment. The Public Enquiry ended on 1 May 2019.

A DfT/EWR report that considers the strategic and economic cases for the Western Section Phase 2 project was published on 7 December 2018.

In July 2019, the EWR Company announced that it will be issuing Invitations to Tender for rolling stock 'later this year', possibly as early as August.

In January 2020, the chairman of the consortium said that, following the public inquiry into the western section that had been held in 2019, he hoped there would be a positive announcement on the TWAO in the 'very near future', with major construction work starting later in 2020. In February 2020, Transport Minister Grant Shapps approved the TWAO.

In March 2020, the company invited tenders for supply of twelve to fourteen three-car (self-powered, driver-controlled) trains on a four-year lease.

In April 2020, the EWR Alliance published its schedule of works, which projects that the infrastructure will be fully tested and ready to use "in 2024".

March 2021 consultation
In March 2021, the company opened "non-statutory" consultation on its plans for the Western (and Central) segments. A more detailed technical report supports the consultation document. In an associated document, it announced that its opening plans for East West Rail have changed, notably deferring indefinitely a connection to Aylesbury.

The new plans divide the schedule into Connect Stages. "Connect Stage 1" should open in 2025 and see two trains per hour from Oxford to Milton Keynes Central. "Connect Stage 2" is planned to run between Oxford and Bedford (Mainline) after upgrading the Marston Vale line.

"Connect Stage 1" proposes changes to Oxford, Oxford Parkway and Bicester Village railway stations. For Oxford, proposals are for two additional platforms (platform 5 and Platform 0), two new sidings south of Platform 1 and 2, additional crossovers and two additional tracks to accommodate the 6 trains per hour planned for EWR. Oxford Parkway and Bicester Village could get expansions to the car parks at both stations. The report moots the closure of the London Road level crossing in Bicester, with several options put forward for replacements.

"Connect Stage 2" might involve:
 a new platform at Bletchley opposite platform 6 (in addition to the high-level platforms already scheduled)
 reinstatement of the second track at 
 possible closure of the original Bow Brickhill and Woburn Sands stations and their merger onto a new site just west of Woburn Sands, in a possible Milton Keynes south-east expansion area.
 relocation of Ridgmont station to accommodate passing loops and a merger with a (potentially closed) 
 relocation of  either close to the hospital or south west of the existing site, both of which options require realignment of the existing track, 
 remodelling Bedford (mainline) railway station (discussed below).
 closure of level crossings across the route

Another option is to replace the stations with five newly relocated stations (at Woburn Sands, Ridgmont,  and Bedford St Johns.

(The consultation also describes the route options between Bedford and Cambridge, as discussed below.)

Engineering and construction works
From April 2020, work began to refurbish the Bletchley Flyover, with sections beside and over the WCML being removed in April and May. The arches crossing Buckingham Road (on the east side of WCML) started being removed on 5 July 2020. During summer 2021, a new structure, in the form of a box tunnel around the WCML, was completed. By early February 2022,  of track had been installed over the new flyover, enabling engineering trains to reach the eastern end of the construction site.

At Bicester, the first section of new track for the EWR2 project was successfully installed in April 2021. "This is a key milestone for the project because it is not only the first section of track, but it will also enable access for the engineering trains that will carry out the track construction across the whole project". At Bletchley in late 2021, track was installed over the new flyover, enabling engineering trains to reach the eastern end of the construction site.

Delivery

Phase 1: Oxford–Bicester
The section from Oxford through Bicester Village to the Chiltern Main Line was rebuilt as part of Phase 2 of Chiltern Railways Project Evergreen and adopted as Phase1 of the East West Rail Link.

Central section
The Varsity Line route trackbed alignment between Bedford and Cambridge is no longer available for East West Rail because key sections of it have been reused for other purposes since the closure of this part of the line in 1968. These include the Ryle Telescope (part of the Mullard Radio Astronomy Observatory), Trumpington Meadows, the Cambridgeshire Guided Busway and National Cycle Route 51 as well as housing at Potton, Sandy, and Trumpington.

Developments and announcements for central section
In March 2016, Network Rail announced that the link would connect to the East Coast Main Line (ECML) via (or near) Sandy. In the 2016 Autumn Statement, the chancellor announced £10million of funding to continue to develop plans for the route.

On 30 October 2018, the Chancellor of the Exchequer announced in his Autumn Budget that £20million was being made available for work to develop a "strategic outline business case" for the Bedford–Cambridge segment.

In December 2018, in a paper published jointly with the Department for Transport, EWR Ltd. reported that it intended to begin consultations on the route of the central section "early in 2019".

On 28 January 2019, East West Railway Company revealed five potential routes in the consultation which ran from 28 January until 11 March 2019.
 Route A involves going from the Marston Vale line to a new Bedford South split-level station with the Midland Main Line then to a relocated  station, south of the existing station. The route then heads east to a new station at Bassingbourn before then joining the Great Northern route to Cambridge.
 Route B involves running from the Marston Vale line to a new Bedford South station before then running to a relocated Sandy (to the north Tempsford area or south of St. Neots). The route heads east to a new station in Cambourne before swinging south to join the existing line northbound to Cambridge.
 Route C involves running from the Marston Vale line to a new Bedford South station before continuing to a new junction station at Tempsford with the ECML and then continuing on the ECML to Sandy. The route then leaves the ECML and heads east to a new station at Bassingbourn before joining the existing line northbound to Cambridge.
 Route D involves running from the existing Bedford (Midland road) station heading north then turning east towards a new Tempsford station before joining the ECML and heading to Sandy. The route then heads east towards a new station at Bassingbourn then joining the existing line northbound to Cambridge.
 Route E involves running from the existing Bedford station heading north then running to Tempsford where a new station would be built then (bypassing Sandy) the route heads east to Cambourne where a new station would be built. The route then joins an existing line northbound to Cambridge

None of the route options connect to Cambridge via  as this option was ruled out in the evaluation stage. However, its section 7.7 concedes that two of its routes could alternatively approach Cambridge from the north if new information is provided to EWR Co through the consultation that suggests that this would be better.

The consultation document proposes a target date of "mid 2020s" for the central section to be completed.

In September 2019, the government declared the Central Section a nationally significant infrastructure project.

Route selected
In January 2020, the company announced that Route E (Bedford Midland – "south of St Neots / Tempsford area" – Cambourne – Cambridge) had been selected as the preferred route.
	
Go-ahead for Cambridge South railway station was announced in the budget of 11 March 2020. 
On 22 June 2020, Network Rail revealed that its preferred location for the station was at a site adjacent to Addenbrooke's Hospital and the Cambridgeshire Guided Busway crossing. The indicative route E corridor for the East West line shows a junction with the West Anglia Main Line (WAML) south of Cambridge but is (deliberately) vague about the precise location of this junction and thus its position relative to that of Cambridge South; local media reports anticipate that it will be such as to enable East West trains to stop here.

In late December 2020, EWR Ltd. announced that it would begin an informal consultation on the route details in "early 2021".

Route option lobbying
The northern route was promoted by a private interest group "CamBedRailRoad", which sought to connect EWR via a new line to Cambridge North. East West Rail Ltd rejected this option in favour of a broad 'route corridor' ("Option E") running south of Cambridge, probably but  not definitely, via a new Cambridge South station on the Cambridge line and the WAML. 
 		 	
A group called "Cambridgeapproaches" was formed in June 2020 from a collection of parishes in the Option E area to review route alignments in the area and to consult residents on alternatives.

2021 BedfordCambridge route alignment consultation

In March 2021, East West Railway Company opened an "informal consultation" on proposals for the Central section’s route alignment. The proposals put forward include:

 in Bedford:
 relocation of Bedford St Johns;
either expansion of the mainline station with three new platforms or complete relocation of the station; 
possibly widening the Midland Main Line corridor north of the station to give EWR its own dedicated tracks;
 narrowing the (EWR) route corridor options near Tempsford and Cambourne:
there are two potential sites for the ECML crossing: one just north of the historic station and the second a mile or so closer to St Neots, which it calls "". Table 9.2 strongly prefers the latter option. Whether there will be a junction station is left for others to decide;
two potential sites are proposed for Cambourne station: one across the A428 from the town and the second on the south side. The report favours the former.
on the approach to Cambridge:
 the option to join the WAML directly is dismissed as infeasible for a variety of reasons; 
 instead, the EWR will merge first with the Cambridge Line (also known as the Shepreth Branch Line) via a grade-separated junction (Hauxton Junction) between Harston and Newton and then onward to the WAML;
 increasing the number of tracks on the WAML from Shepreth Junction to Cambridge (central) station from two to four, with associated changes to that junction;
 two further platforms to be added at Cambridge, using space currently allocated to sidings.

2021 BletchleyBedford stations review
In the same consultation, the company put forward proposals for the stations between Bletchley and Bedford (currently known as the Marston Vale Line. The proposals put forward include: 
 could be relocated to the western outskirts of the town, between the existing Woburn Sands and  stations, which would close;  
 could be relocated to the west;
 could be relocated between the existing Lidlington and  stations which would close;
 could be relocated between the existing Stewartby and  stations which would close

BedfordCambridge route announcement plan
In the March 2023 budget, the Chancellor announced that "in May, the government will confirm the route for the new Bedford-Cambridge section, and will provide capacity funding to support local authorities to develop their plans for strategic economic growth around new stations".

Eastern section

The track in this section is all in place and operational: from Cambridge to Norwich, Felixstowe and Ipswich. The plan would see more services on the existing Felixstowe Branch Line, Ipswich to Ely Line, and parts of the East Suffolk Line and Great Eastern Main Line. Hourly services in both directions between Cambridge and Ipswich were started in 2004. There are also hourly passenger services between Cambridge and Norwich operated by Greater Anglia, although these run on the Breckland line (via  and ) instead of the Great Eastern Main Line.

A section of Felixstowe Branch Line was doubled in 2009 to allow freight trains to pass each other at Derby Road in Ipswich and there were plans to double  of route from Nacton to Trimley together with other work as part of the Felixstowe and Nuneaton freight capacity scheme. The "Bacon Factory Curve" in Ipswich was completed in March 2014 to allow trains from Felixstowe to continue to the West Midlands without reversing at Ipswich.

In January 2019, East West Rail Consortium released a document to press the case for the Eastern section to Norwich via Ely, and to Ipswich via Bury St Edmunds.

See also

Oxford-Cambridge Arc
Felixstowe to Nuneaton railway upgrade

Notes

References

Sources

  (Inspector's report)

External links
East West Rail Partnership home page
East West Railway Company
 East West Rail Bicester to Bedford improvements: Transport and Works Act order includes Inspector's report.
 East West Rail Alliance (Atkins Lang O'Rourke, NetworkRail, VolkerRail) project newsletters
 

  (Identifies EWR as a priority for electrification if diesel-hauling for freight trains is to be reduced substantially) 

 
Rail transport in Bedfordshire
Rail transport in Buckinghamshire
Rail transport in Milton Keynes
Rail transport in Oxfordshire
Rail transport in Cambridgeshire
Rail transport in Suffolk
Rail transport in Hertfordshire
Rail transport in Cambridge
Proposed transport infrastructure in the East of England
Nationally Significant Infrastructure Projects (United Kingdom)